Junction City High School is a public high school in Junction City, Oregon, United States.

Academics
In 2008, 88% of the school's seniors received a high school diploma.

Notable alumni
 Josh Wilcox - NFL tight end
 Justin Wilcox - football head coach, University of California, Berkeley

References

High schools in Lane County, Oregon
Junction City, Oregon
Public high schools in Oregon